Black Potts Railway Bridge carries the railway from London (Waterloo) to Windsor, Berkshire across the River Thames. The Staines to Windsor & Eton Line terminates immediately after the bridge at Windsor and Eton Riverside railway station. The bridge crosses the Thames on the reach above Old Windsor Lock, shortly before Romney Lock.

History
In 1849 the Windsor Staines and Richmond Railway sought leave to erect a temporary crossing here and the bridge was opened in 1850. The opening delay was caused by the collapse of one of the piers on the day before inspection. The bridge is supported in the middle by Black Potts Ait. Originally the bridge had ornate cast-iron ribs, but these corroded and were replaced with more utilitarian wrought iron girders, which radically altered the bridge's appearance.

Black Potts Viaduct

Immediately to the east of the bridge is the Black Potts Railway Viaduct. This had to be provided with substantial protection when the Jubilee River was constructed, as the outfall of this channel passes through the brick arches of the existing Victorian viaduct, just downstream of the Black Potts Railway Bridge.

See also
 Crossings of the River Thames

References

External links
Structurae database entry

Railway bridges in Berkshire
Bridges completed in 1850
Bridges across the River Thames
Buildings and structures in the Royal Borough of Windsor and Maidenhead